Mir Humayun Khan Marri served as the Deputy Chairman of the Senate of Pakistan from 21 March 1997 to 12 October 1999.

References

Living people
Pakistani politicians
Year of birth missing (living people)
Place of birth missing (living people)
Deputy chairmen of the Senate of Pakistan